Tallapragada Prakasarayudu (April 1893 – Feb 1988) was an Indian social reformer, freedom fighter, educationist, and writer. He was a prominent Gandhian and a distinguished exponent of Brahmoism. India has produced a few great men who led exemplary lives and silently influenced the lives of other men. Shri Prakasarayadu exemplifies the values of supreme self-sacrifice, personal rectitude, quiet efficiency and a desire to avoid lime light. His services in the cause of education are inestimable.
Dedicated wholly to the Gandhian principles, Shri Prakasarayadu lived an unostentatious life. He grew cotton and spun on Charkha since 1921, devotedly performing the 'Sutra Yagna' of Gandhiji in spirit and action. After the independence of India, he continued his freedom struggle to leave no stone unturned to attain real freedom which consists in social justice and economic equality. He discharged his duties to all constructive programmes connected with national integration, social reform, religious harmony, propagation of Khadi, prohibition, basic education, anti-dowry movement, removal of untouchability and eradication of casteism.

References

Gallery

1893 births
1988 deaths
Gandhians
Indian social reformers
People from West Godavari district
Indian independence activists from Andhra Pradesh